Pelosia ramosula is a moth of the family Erebidae. It was described by Otto Staudinger in 1887. It is found in the Russian Far East (Middle Amur, Primorye, Sakhalin, Kunashir), China (Jiangsu, Yunan, Fujiang, Guangdong) and Japan.

References

Lithosiina
Moths described in 1887